Darko Rajaković (born 22 February 1979) is a Serbian basketball coach, currently working as an assistant coach for the Memphis Grizzlies of the National Basketball Association (NBA).

Rajaković was the head coach of the Tulsa 66ers of the NBA G League for two seasons and the first head coach in NBA G League history born outside of North America.

Education 
Rajaković earned his degree in basketball coaching from the Belgrade Basketball Academy in 2004 and earned his degree in sports management from Alfa BK University in 2006.

Coaching career

Early career 
Rajaković began his coaching career at 16 years old with Borac Čačak in Čačak, Serbia. Following his three-year stint in Čačak, Rajaković was named the head coach for the Crvena zvezda youth system in Belgrade. During his eight years in Belgrade, Rajaković led Crvena zvezda to two Serbian Youth championships. To increase his basketball coaching acumen and knowledge, Rajakovic spent time with Lute Olson at the University of Arizona (2003) and Mike Krzyzewski at the Duke University (2007) and attended team practices and meetings at both universities.

From 2004 to 2011, Rajaković served as a scouting consultant and NBA Summer League assistant coach for the San Antonio Spurs.

Espacio Torrelodones (2009–2012) 
In 2009, Rajaković become the head coach of Espacio Torrelodones of the Spanish EBA League (4th-tier). Rajaković excelled in both recruiting and developing players. In his first season, Rajaković led the Torrelodones to the Primera Division – Community of Madrid Group (5th-tier) title, promoting the team to the Liga EBA. In the 2010–11 Liga EBA season, the Torrelodones finished 7th in Group B with a 16–14 record. In the next season and his last as their coach, the Torrelodones finished 8th in Group B with the same record as for season before.

Tulsa 66ers (2012–2014) 
In 2012, Rajaković became the head coach of the Tulsa 66ers of the NBA Development League. Rajaković led Tulsa to a combined 51-49 record over two seasons, including a 27-23 record and NBA D-League Semifinals appearance in 2012–13. During his time with the 66ers, Tulsa was assigned seven players from Oklahoma City a total of 50 times (the most in the league during that stretch), including Oklahoma City players such as Reggie Jackson, Perry Jones, Jeremy Lamb and André Roberson. Rajaković witnessed five of his Tulsa players receive call-ups to the NBA, including four to the Oklahoma City (Grant Jerrett, Daniel Orton, Mustafa Shakur and Reggie Williams). He coached 11 Tulsa players over the two years who were on an NBA roster in the 2013–14 season.

NBA assistant (2014–present) 
On 5 July 2014, Rajaković was named assistant coach of the Oklahoma City Thunder. During his time with the Thunder, Rajaković has helped develop many players, including Steven Adams, Andre Roberson, Terrance Ferguson, Victor Oladipo, Dennis Schröder, and Alex Abrines. Rajaković served as the Thunder’s head coach at NBA Summer League in 2014 and 2015. He was on the Western Conference All-Star Team coaching staff in 2014. Rajaković helped lead the Thunder to the playoffs four consecutive seasons (2016, 2017, 2018, and 2019), making it to the 2016 NBA Western Conference Finals.

On June 26, 2019, Rajaković was hired as an assistant coach for the Phoenix Suns.

On September 13, 2020, Rajaković was hired as an assistant coach for the Memphis Grizzlies. On January 11, 2022, Rajaković as the interim head coach led the Grizzlies to a 116–108 win over the Golden State Warriors. It was his head coaching debut in NBA. After his fellow Serbian countryman Igor Kokoškov, he is the second European who led an NBA team in a regular season game. Rajaković finished his stint as the interim head coach with a 4–1 record.

In May 2022, Rajaković was featured in ESPN's annual report on potential coaching candidates to watch. The article stated, "People all over the coaching world, as well as players who have benefited from his grasp of the game, rave about Darko Rajakovic. That makes a lot of sense when you consider he has been poached twice -- Phoenix and Memphis -- over the past couple of years by incoming head coaches assembling a staff from scratch. A European head coach has yet to break through with a sustained career in the NBA, but Rajakovic (Serbia) has the intellect and passion for the craft that makes him the current morning-line favorite to become the first. The man has authored academic-journal style articles about the evolution of the pick-and-roll, but he's anything but academic in his warmth with players and fellow coaches."

Serbian national team (2019) 
On July 18, 2019, Rajaković was hired as an assistant coach for the Serbia men's national basketball team under Aleksandar Đorđević. He made a debut at the 2019 FIBA Basketball World Cup where Serbia won the fifth place.

Head coaching record

NBA Development League

|-
| align="left" |Tulsa
| align="left" |2012–13
|50||27||23|||| align="center" |3rd in Central||5||2||3||
| align="center" |Lost Semifinals
|-
| align="left" |Tulsa
| align="left" |2013–14
|50||24||26|||| align="center" |5th in Central||||||||
| align="center" |Missed Playoffs
|-
|-class="sortbottom"
| align="left" |Career
| ||100||51||49|||| ||5||2||3||

See also
 List of Serbian NBA coaches
 List of foreign NBA coaches

References

External links 
Coach information at Basketball-reference.com

1979 births
Living people
KK Crvena zvezda youth coaches
National Basketball Association scouts from Europe
Oklahoma City Thunder assistant coaches
Phoenix Suns assistant coaches
San Antonio Spurs assistant coaches
Serbian basketball scouts
Serbian men's basketball coaches
Serbian expatriate basketball people in the United States
Serbian expatriate basketball people in Spain
Tulsa 66ers coaches